McKay Bay is the name given to the northeastern corner of Tampa Bay, a body of water in Tampa, Florida. The McKay Bay Greenway runs through the area on the east side of McKay Bay and connects to the Tampa Bypass Canal. McKay Bay Nature Park is located at 685 North 34th Street in Tampa. The area also includes the McKay Bay Resource Recovery Plant, a power plant fueled with refuse. The lake was man-made and was once used as a cooling pond for a city incinerator. McKay Bay is at the northeast corner of Hillsborough Bay, which is the name given to the portion of Tampa Bay on the east side of Tampa's Interbay Peninsula. It is named after James McKay Sr.

The Lake is undredged and shallow. It is surrounded by mangrove and salt marsh wetlands. At low tide, the exposed area is a feeding ground for migratory waterfowl, shorebirds and wading birds. Avian residents include the American avocet, black-necked stilt, black skimmer, white pelican, Northern shoveler, canvasback, green wing teal, ruddy duck and glossy ibis.

McKay Bay Nature Park is a 38-acre park on McKay Bay that is part of the larger 200-acre McKay Bay Park and Greenway. The park is a location along the Great Florida Birding Trail. There is a .17 mile boardwalk trail through mangroves and mudflats, an observation tower that doubles as an education pavilion, a paved 1.25 mile multi-use trail and .5-mile nature trail. Picnic tables and interpretive signage are offered.

References

Tampa Bay
Bays of Florida on the Gulf of Mexico
Geography of Tampa, Florida
Bodies of water of Hillsborough County, Florida